Dorian Lawrence Finney-Smith (born May 4, 1993) is an American professional basketball player for the Brooklyn Nets of the National Basketball Association (NBA). He played college basketball for Virginia Tech and Florida.
After spending his first seven seasons with the Dallas Mavericks, he was traded to the Nets in February 2023.

High school career
Finney-Smith attended I. C. Norcom High School in Portsmouth, Virginia. As a junior in 2009–10 playing for the school's basketball team, he averaged 19.7 points, 13 rebounds, six assists, three steals, and two blocks per game.

In September 2010, Finney-Smith committed to Virginia Tech, and later signed a National Letter of Intent with the Hokies in December.

As a senior at Norcom in 2010–11, Finney-Smith averaged 18 points, 10.7 rebounds, and 3.8 blocks per game. He led the team to back-to-back Group AAA state championships, along with Eastern Region and District titles. He recorded 19 points, 17 rebounds and three blocks in the state championship game as a senior. He finished his high school career as a two-time VHSL Class AAA Player of the Year and first-team all-state, all-region, All-Tidewater and all-district. He also earned All-Tidewater player of the year as a junior and co-player of the year as a senior.

College career
As a freshman at Virginia Tech in 2011–12, Finney-Smith played in all 33 games, making 30 starts. He averaged 6.3 points and 7.0 rebounds per game and was named to the ACC All-Freshman Team. He scored a season-high 17 points in a 66–65 win over Boston College.

In June 2012, Finney-Smith transferred to Florida and was forced to sit out the 2012–13 season due to NCAA transfer regulations.

As a sophomore in 2013–14, Finney-Smith was named SEC Sixth Man of the Year, becoming just the second Gator to win the award after Chris Richard in 2007. He was Florida's leading rebounder, both in total rebounds (247) and per-game average (6.7). He also recorded the first 20/15 performance by a Gator in a road game during Billy Donovan's tenure, totaling a personal-best 22 points in an overtime win over Arkansas. He appeared in 37 games with two starting assignments, averaging 8.7 points, 6.7 rebounds, and 2.1 assists in 25.8 minutes per game.

As a junior in 2014–15, Finney-Smith was named second-team All-SEC by the coaches and was Florida's leading scorer (13.1), rebounder (6.2) and three-point shooter (.426). He scored a career-high 25 points in Florida's win over Jacksonville, including a 5-for-7 performance from three-point range.

As a senior in 2015–16, Finney-Smith was named second-team All-SEC by the coaches and third-team All-SEC by the Associated Press. He was Florida's leading scorer (14.7) for the second straight season and top rebounder (8.3) for the third consecutive season. He became the first Florida player to join the 1,000-point club after transferring to the school mid-tenure. His 1,220 career points at Florida rank 36th in school history.

Professional career

Dallas Mavericks (2016–2023)

2016–2019: Early years 
After going undrafted in the 2016 NBA draft, Finney-Smith signed with the Dallas Mavericks on July 8, and joined the team for the 2016 NBA Summer League. Finney-Smith secured an opening-night roster spot after impressing the Mavericks during training camp and preseason. After playing less than five minutes cumulatively over the first five games of the 2016–17 season, Finney-Smith played 31 minutes on November 6 against the Milwaukee Bucks, including most of the second half and overtime. He subsequently recorded five points, three rebounds, three steals and one block in an 86–75 win. Two days later, he made his first career start, scoring five points in a 109–97 win over the Los Angeles Lakers. On December 9, he had a season-best game with career highs of 12 points and eight rebounds (equal game high) in a 111–103 win over the Indiana Pacers. On December 12, he had career highs in points and rebounds for the second straight home game, finishing with 13 points and nine boards in a 112–92 win over the Denver Nuggets.

On March 10, 2018, Finney-Smith played in his first game since November 12, 2017, after missing 51 straight games and 57 overall with left knee quadriceps tendinitis. He had seven points in 18 minutes in the Mavericks' 114–80 win over the Memphis Grizzlies. On April 6, he recorded season-highs of 15 points and ten rebounds in a 113–106 overtime loss to the Detroit Pistons.

On November 2, 2018, Finney-Smith scored a season-high 19 points, alongside seven rebounds, two assists and two steals, in a 118–106 loss to the New York Knicks.

2019–2023: Starting role and contract extension 
On July 11, 2019, Finney-Smith re-signed with the Mavericks on a 3-year, $12 million contract. On November 18, he had a then-career high 22 points in a 117–110 victory over the San Antonio Spurs. On August 4, 2020, Finney-Smith grabbed a career high 16 rebounds in a 114–110 win over the Sacramento Kings. On August 8, he had a then-career high 27 points and a career high six three pointers made in a 136–132 victory against the Milwaukee Bucks. The Mavericks qualified for the postseason for the first time since 2016 and faced the Los Angeles Clippers during their first round series. Finney-Smith made his playoff debut on August 17, recording nine points, four rebounds, two assists and two steals in a 118–110 Game 1 loss. The Mavericks were eventually eliminated in six games by the Clippers.

On April 5, 2021, Finney-Smith recorded a season-high 23 points, alongside six rebounds and four assists, in a 111–103 win over the Utah Jazz. For the second straight year, the Mavericks faced the Clippers during the first round of the playoffs. On May 22, Finney-Smith recorded 18 points and five rebounds in a 113–103 Game 1 win. The Mavericks were eliminated by the Clippers in seven games, despite an 18-point, 10-rebound effort from Finney-Smith in the Mavericks' 126–111 Game 7 loss.

On February 12, 2022, Finney-Smith signed a four-year, $52 million veteran extension with the Mavericks. He scored a career-high 28 points on March 30 in a 120–112 win over the Cleveland Cavaliers. The Mavericks beat the Utah Jazz in the first round of the playoffs and advanced to face the Phoenix Suns in the second round. On May 8, during the Mavericks' second-round series against the Suns, Finney-Smith scored a playoff career-high 24 points, alongside eight three-pointers and eight rebounds, in a 111–101 Game 4 win. The Mavericks defeated the Suns in seven games, but were eliminated in a five-game series in the Western Conference Finals by the Golden State Warriors, who went on to win the NBA Finals. In Game 4 of the Conference Finals, Finney-Smith recorded 23 points, six rebounds and two assists in a 119–109 Game 4 win.

Brooklyn Nets (2023–present)
On February 6, 2023, Finney-Smith was traded, alongside Spencer Dinwiddie, an unprotected 2029 first-round pick, and second-round picks in 2027 and 2029, to the Brooklyn Nets in exchange for Kyrie Irving and Markieff Morris.

NBA career statistics

Regular season

|-
| style="text-align:left;"| 
| style="text-align:left;"| Dallas
| 81 || 35 || 20.3 || .372 || .293 || .754 || 2.7 || .8 || .6 || .3 || 4.3
|-
| style="text-align:left;"| 
| style="text-align:left;"| Dallas
| 21 || 13 || 21.3 || .380 || .299 || .733 || 3.6 || 1.2 || .5 || .2 || 5.9
|-
| style="text-align:left;"| 
| style="text-align:left;"| Dallas
| 81 || 26 || 24.5 || .432 || .311 || .709 || 4.8 || 1.2 || .9 || .4 || 7.5
|-
| style="text-align:left;"| 
| style="text-align:left;"| Dallas
| 71 || 68 || 29.9 || .466 || .376 || .722 || 5.7 || 1.6 || .6 || .5 || 9.5
|-
| style="text-align:left;"| 
| style="text-align:left;"| Dallas
| 60 || 60 || 32.0 || .472 || .394 || .756 || 5.4 || 1.7 || .9 || .4 || 9.8
|-
| style="text-align:left;"|
| style="text-align:left;"|Dallas
| 80 || 80 || 33.1 || .471 || .395 || .675 || 4.7 || 1.9 || 1.1 || .5 || 11.0
|-
| style="text-align:left;"| 
| style="text-align:left;"| Dallas
| 40 || 40 || 32.2 || .416 || .355 || .750 || 4.7 || 1.5 || 1.0 || .5 || 9.1
|- class="sortbottom"
| style="text-align:center;" colspan="2"|  Career
| 434 || 322 || 27.8 || .443 || .360 || .721 || 4.6 || 1.4 || .8 || .4 || 8.3

Playoffs

|-
| style="text-align:left;"| 
| style="text-align:left;"| Dallas
| 6 || 6 || 31.8 || .442 || .367 || .800 || 5.7 || 3.2 || 1.2 || .5 || 10.2
|-
| style="text-align:left;"| 
| style="text-align:left;"| Dallas
| 7 || 7 || 38.7 || .406 || .432 || .800 || 6.6 || 2.1 || 1.1 || .3 || 10.3
|-
| style="text-align:left;"| 
| style="text-align:left;"| Dallas
| 18 || 18 || 38.2 || .471 || .426 || .708 || 5.5 || 1.9 || .9 || .4 || 11.7
|- class="sortbottom"
| style="text-align:center;" colspan="2"| Career
| 31 || 31 || 37.1 || .451 || .417 || .735 || 5.8 || 2.2 || 1.0 || .4 || 11.1

References

External links

Florida Gators bio

1993 births
Living people
African-American basketball players
American men's basketball players
Basketball players from Virginia
Brooklyn Nets players
Dallas Mavericks players
Florida Gators men's basketball players
Sportspeople from Portsmouth, Virginia
Small forwards
Undrafted National Basketball Association players
Virginia Tech Hokies men's basketball players
21st-century African-American sportspeople